Lamprospora is a genus of fungi in the family Pyronemataceae.

Species
As accepted by Species Fungorum;

 Lamprospora ammophila 
 Lamprospora aneurae 
 Lamprospora annulata 
 Lamprospora asperella 
 Lamprospora astroidea 
 Lamprospora aurantiaca 
 Lamprospora bavarica 
 Lamprospora brevispinosa 
 Lamprospora cailletii 
 Lamprospora campylopodis 
 Lamprospora carbonicola 
 Lamprospora crechqueraultii 
 Lamprospora densireticulata 
 Lamprospora dicranellae 
 Lamprospora dictydiola 
 Lamprospora ecksteinii 
 Lamprospora exasperata 
 Lamprospora faroensis 
 Lamprospora funigera 
 Lamprospora gotlandica 
 Lamprospora hispanica 
 Lamprospora hungarica 
 Lamprospora irregulariata 
 Lamprospora knajaschensis 
 Lamprospora kristiansenii 
 Lamprospora leptodictya 
 Lamprospora lubicensis 
 Lamprospora miniata 
 Lamprospora minuta 
 Lamprospora modesta 
 Lamprospora modestissima 
 Lamprospora moynei Benkert 
 Lamprospora nigrans 
 Lamprospora norvegica 
 Lamprospora polytrichina 
 Lamprospora pseudoarvensis 
 Lamprospora rehmii 
 Lamprospora retinosa 
 Lamprospora retispora 
 Lamprospora rugensis 
 Lamprospora schroeteri 
 Lamprospora seaveri 
 Lamprospora sphagnicola 
 Lamprospora spitsbergensis 
 Lamprospora sylvatica 
 Lamprospora tortulae-ruralis 
 Lamprospora tropica 
 Lamprospora varanasiensis 
 Lamprospora verrucispora 
 Lamprospora verruculosa 
 Lamprospora wisconsinensis 
 Lamprospora wrightii 

Former species;

 L. amethystina  = Marcelleina persoonii Pezizaceae family
 L. areolata  = Octospora areolata 
 L. areolata var. australis  = Octospora australis 
 L. arvensis  = Octospora arvensis 
 L. ascoboloides  = Octospora ascoboloides 
 L. astroidea var. lichenicola  = Lamprospora astroidea 
 L. australis  = Octospora australis 
 L. biannulata  = Octospora biannulata 
 L. calospora  = Moravecia calospora 
 L. carbonaria  = Pulvinula carbonaria Pulvinulaceae
 L. cashiae  = Octospora cashiae 
 L. chopraiana  = Marcelleina chopraiana Pezizaceae
 L. cinnabarina  = Pulvinula cinnabarina Pulvinulaceae
 L. constellatio  = Pulvinula convexella Pulvinulaceae
 L. crechqueraultii var. macrantha  = Lamprospora crechqueraultii 
 L. crechqueraultii var. modesta  = Lamprospora modesta 
 L. crechqueraultii var. ovalispora  = Octospora ovalispora 
 L. crechqueraultii var. paludosa  = Oviascoma paludosum 
 L. crouanii  = Lamprospora miniata 
 L. crouanii f. magnihyphosa  = Lamprospora miniata 
 L. detonia  = Phaeopezia detonia Pezizaceae
 L. discoidea  = Pulvinula discoidea Pulvinulaceae
 L. ditrichi  = Octospora ditrichi 
 L. feurichiana  = Octospora feurichiana 
 L. fulgens  = Caloscypha fulgens Caloscyphaceae
 L. georgii  = Marcelleina georgii Pezizaceae
 L. haemastigma  = Humaria haemastigma 
 L. haemastigma var. gigantea  = Humaria haemastigma 
 L. hanffii  = Octospora hanffii 
 L. insignispora  = Octospora insignispora 
 L. jetelae  = Pulparia jetelae Pulvinulaceae
 L. laetirubra  = Pulvinula cinnabarina Pulvinulaceae
 L. leiocarpa  = Plicaria endocarpoides 
 L. lobata  = Lazuardia lobata 
 L. lutziana  = Octospora lutziana 
 L. macrantha  = Lamprospora crechqueraultii 
 L. maireana  = Octospora maireana 
 L. miniata f. parvispora  = Lamprospora miniata 
 L. miniata var. parvispora = Lamprospora miniata''' 
 L. miniata var. ratisbonensis  = Lamprospora miniata 
 L. miniata var. retispora  = Lamprospora retispora 
 L. miniatopsis  = Octospora miniatopsis 
 L. multiguttula  = Pulvinula multiguttula Pulvinulaceae
 L. mussooriensis  = Pulvinula mussooriensis Pulvinulaceae
 L. ovalispora  = Octospora ovalispora L. paechnatzii  = Octospora paechnatzii L. planchonis  = Smardaea planchonis L. planchonis var. ovalispora  = Smardaea ovalispora L. polytrichi  = Octospora polytrichi L. pyrophila  = Pulvinula pyrophila); Pulvinulaceae
 L. rickii  = Marcelleina rickii); Pezizaceae
 L. salmonicolor  = Pulvinula salmonicolor); Pulvinulaceae
 L. spinulosa  = Octospora spinulosa 
 L. spinulosa var. magnispora  = Octospora spinulosa L. tetraspora  = Pulvinula tetraspora Pulvinulaceae
 L. trachycarpa  = Plicaria trachycarpa 
 L. trachycarpa var. ferruginea  = Plicaria trachycarpa L. tuberculata sensu  = Octospora maireana 
 L. tuberculata  = Octospora tuberculata 
 L. tuberculatella  = Octospora tuberculatella'' 

Note; if no family shown, still within the Pyronemataceae Family.

References

External links

Pyronemataceae
Pezizales genera
Taxa named by Giuseppe De Notaris
Taxa described in 1863